Metasia ossealis is a moth in the family Crambidae. It was described by Staudinger in 1879. It is found in Turkey.

Taxonomy
It was resurrected from synonymy with Palepicorsia ustrinalis in 2001.

References

Moths described in 1879
Metasia